Luleå Theatre Academy is a Swedish drama school in Luleå and part of the Luleå University of Technology.

The Theatre Academy was started in the autumn of 1996 as a joint project between the former University College of Technology and the regional Theatre of Norrbotten. This was the fourth university college of drama in Sweden and the first drama school in Norrland on a university level. It is situated next to the Norrbotten Theater House and thereby has close cooperation with them.

External links
Luleå University of Technology

Drama schools in Sweden
Luleå